Superfrog is a scrolling 2D platform game, originally developed for the Amiga and published in 1993 by Team17. Later releases were handled by Ocean Software and GOG.com.

Gameplay 

The objective of the game is to find and defeat a witch, thus rescuing a princess, whilst achieving smaller objectives throughout the game, such as finding a golden key or escaping from captivity in a circus.

There are 24 regular levels, divided into six differently-themed worlds. The goal of each level is to collect a set number of coins, and then reach the exit, which will only open if Superfrog has collected enough coins. Extra factors of gameplay include a timer countdown and a number of health points, both of which can be restored by finding bottles of Lucozade among the levels.

Depending on the number of coins and fruit collected, and on how fast the player finishes the level, a number of credits (up to a maximum of 15) are awarded at the end of each level. The player can then choose to either collect the credits for a score or gamble them in a slot machine-style minigame for more bonuses. The most important function of the slot machine minigame is the chance to win a level code, enabling the player to restart the game from the beginning of the next level at a later time.

An extra level between world 5 and 6 takes the form of a side-scrolling shoot 'em up called Project-F in homage to Team17's own Project-X (even going as far as using a remixed version of the original game's theme tune). Rather than collecting coins, the objective of this stage is to survive to the end. This level was omitted from the PC conversion of the game. After completing all six worlds, the game ends with a small boss fight against the witch in a castle setting.

Plot
The story, present in the game's manual but mostly conveyed through the introductory animation by Eric W. Schwartz, concerns an unnamed prince, who is turned into a frog by a jealous witch, in homage to the Frog Prince fairy tale. His princess girlfriend is then abducted by the same witch. Subsequently, sulking by the "River O' Despair", the prince chances upon a floating bottle of Lucozade, which confers upon him super powers. With his new powers, the prince heads off to fight the evil witch and save the princess.

Development
Superfrog was developed in 1993 and released for the Amiga in the same year by Team17, acting simultaneously as developer and publisher. The release was popular enough to spawn an Amiga CD32 version, which could also be played on some Amiga computers fitted with a CD drive. Due to its enduring popularity, it was then converted for the PC by Bubball Systems in 1994, running as an MS-DOS program. Eric W. Schwartz provided the animation for the introduction. The Amiga version was re-released by Islona Software in 1999, with slightly different box art. In 2012, Superfrog was, along with other games by Team17, released as a legitimate digital download from GoodOldGames.com, this version being the first compatible with Windows.

Reception 

Team17's earlier games became relatively obscure after the release of the hugely popular Worms series, though many gamers remember Superfrog fondly for its solid gameplay, smooth scrolling, cartoon-quality graphics, and upbeat music by composer Allister Brimble. Although a relatively small release by the standards of blockbuster platformers like Sonic, it was very well received and has retained a fan base which considers it an excellent example of the genre.

Rerelease
On 13 February 2013, Team17 announced they would be reviving Superfrog for its 20th anniversary, and releasing a HD version of the game on PSN. This remastered version was co-developed by both Team17 and TickTockGames, formerly Bubball Systems, the company initially responsible for the MS-DOS port of Superfrog in 1994.

Superfrog HD was released in 2013 for the PlayStation 3 and PlayStation Vita, then later Microsoft Windows via Steam, OS X, Linux, Android, and iOS.

In May 2016, Superfrog HD was discontinued by Team17; due to low sales and negative reception, the game was removed from PSN, Steam, App Store and Google Play. At the same time, the original Superfrog game was removed from GOG.com.

References

External links
 Superfrog at Mobygames

1993 video games
Amiga games
Amiga CD32 games
DOS games
Fictional frogs
Games commercially released with DOSBox
IOS games
Linux games
MacOS games
Platform games
PlayStation Network games
Team17 games
Video games about amphibians
Video games scored by Allister Brimble
Video games developed in the United Kingdom
Windows games
Video games about witchcraft
Single-player video games